{{DISPLAYTITLE:C2H5NO}}
The molecular formula C2H5NO (molar mass: 59.07 g/mol, exact mass: 59.03711 u) may refer to:

 Acetaldoxime
 Acetamide
 Aminoacetaldehyde
 N-Methylformamide (NMF)